The John Brett Richeson House in Maysville, Kentucky was built in 1832 and purchased by John Richeson, an educator  from  Charlottesville, Virginia, for his wife Mildred  Richeson and their eight children.  The house was occupied by the Richeson family for more than 100 years until the death of Edward Richeson in 1941.

The Richeson family provided Maysville with some of the most accomplished and brilliant teachers ever known in Kentucky, and they helped to establish Maysville as a leading educational community during the period 1832–1880.  Several of John Richeson's children were teachers, including sons William and John Richeson,  and his daughter Ann  Frances Richeson Peers.  Several grandchildren were also teachers.

Maysville Academy
Upon his arrival in Maysville in 1832,  John  Brett  Richeson, in partnership with professor Jacob Rand, founded and operated Maysville Academy for several decades.  The academy was the first successful secondary school in Maysville and specialized in preparing young men for university level studies.  It attracted  a number of students who later attained prominence including:
  Ulysses Grant, Civil War General and two-term U.S. President
  William "Bull" Nelson, Civil War General
  Walter Newman Haldeman,  Editor and  founder of  the  Louisville Courier
  John J. Crittenden,  accomplished jurist and  politician
  Thomas H. Nelson,  U.S. Minister to Mexico
  Henry Stanton, Confederate soldier and Poet Laureate
  Ormond Beatty, educator and President of Centre College

Rosemary Clooney
Singer and actress Rosemary Clooney was born in Maysville and lived in the Richeson House in the late 1940s. The city named a nearby street in her  honor when her first movie, The Stars Are Singing, premiered at the Russell Theatre.

References

National Register of Historic Places in Mason County, Kentucky
Houses on the National Register of Historic Places in Kentucky
Houses completed in 1832
Houses in Maysville, Kentucky
1832 establishments in Kentucky
Greek Revival architecture in Kentucky